The Ventimiglia were a noble family of Liguria, now in Italy. Descendants of the family held positions and titles of nobility in Sicily in Mediaeval times and later.

Members of the family 
 Giovanni I Ventimiglia (1383–1475), eighth count of Geraci (from 1405); Marquis of Geraci from 1436; also Lord of Castelbuono, Tusa, Gangi, San Mauro (San Mauro Castelverde), Pollina, Caronia (from 1412), Cefalù, Sciacca, Termini Imerese, Count of Montesarchio, Bitonto, Casamassima, Serracapriola, Castellamare di Stabia, Orta Nova and Magliano, Baron of Ciminna..., Grande Ammiraglio del Regno (Grand Admiral of Sicily Kingdom), Viceré di Sicilia, (Viceroy of Sicily), 1430–1432, Governatore del Regno di Napoli (Governor of Naples Kingdom), 1435, Viceroy of Duchy Athens and Neopatria, 1444, Regent of Naples Kingdom, 1460, Captain General of the Church, 1445 and 1455.

 Giovanni II Ventimiglia, marquis of Geraci (1559–1619), lord of Castelbuono, Gangi, Pollina, Pettineo and San Mauro, was acting Viceroy of Sicily from 1595 to 1598.

 Salvatore Ventimiglia (d. Palermo, April 1797), Bishop of Catania, son of the 3rd Princes of Belmonte

 Francesco I Ventimiglia

Lascaris di Ventimiglia 

A branch line, the Lascaris (di Ventimiglia) Conti di Tenda, is descended in female line from the Laskaris of the Empire of Nicaea through the marriage in 1261 of Guglielmo Pietro I, Conte di Ventimiglia, Signore de Tenda (d. 1282) with Eudokia Laskarina (1248–1311), daughter of Emperor Theodore II Laskaris and his wife Princess Elena of Bulgaria.

References

Further reading 

 
Sicilian nobility